Marek Hlinka (born 4 October 1990) is a Slovak footballer who currently plays in Czech Republic for Trinity Zlín as a midfielder.

Hlinka started his club career at Banská Bystrica, where he made 90 league appearances. He joined Dukla Prague in July 2013.

References

External links

1990 births
Living people
Sportspeople from Banská Bystrica
Slovak footballers
Association football midfielders
FK Dukla Banská Bystrica players
FK Železiarne Podbrezová players
FK Dukla Prague players
MFK Skalica players
FC Baník Ostrava players
FC Torpedo Kutaisi players
FC Fastav Zlín players
Czech First League players
Slovak Super Liga players
Erovnuli Liga players
Slovak expatriate footballers
Expatriate footballers in the Czech Republic
Expatriate footballers in Georgia (country)
Slovakia youth international footballers
Slovakia under-21 international footballers
FC Spartak Trnava players